Pydah College of Engineering and Technology (PCET), established in 2002, is a technical college in Gambheeram, Boyapalem, Visakhapatnam, Andhra Pradesh, India. PCET is affiliated with Jawaharlal Nehru Technological University, Kakinada (JNTUK) and has All India Council for Technical Education approval. 

It is one of the many educational institutes of the Pydah Educational Academy. The chairman of Pydah Educational Academy is Shri. Pydah Krishna Prasad.

Academic programmes

Undergraduate Courses (B. Tech.)
CSE – Computer Science and Engineering
ECE – Electronics and Communications Engineering
EEE – Electrical and Electronics Engineering
CIVIL – Civil Engineering
IT – Information Technology
MECH – Mechanical Engineering

Postgraduate courses
MBA
MCA

External links

http://www.facebook.com/ManaPydah/

Engineering colleges in Andhra Pradesh
Universities and colleges in Visakhapatnam
2002 establishments in Andhra Pradesh
Educational institutions established in 2002